Police corruption in Mexico is currently one of the greatest challenges facing Mexican law enforcement agencies and politics. Corruption within Mexico is spurred on by high unemployment rates, low wages, and the widespread prevalence of drug trafficking.

History of corruption
Corruption in Mexico has its roots in colonial times. With the arrival of conquistadors, the Spanish crown began assigning offices of power to certain wealthy and influential people . These offices were often short-lived because officials were charged with collecting revenue, maintaining order, and sustaining their regions while relying on only local sources of wealth and sustenance. People began to learn how to manipulate their local political leaders and would hold fiestas to gain favor with political leaders. This system of bribery and purchasing one's way into power and influence continued into post-colonial times, where the Mexican society organized itself into a pyramid-like hierarchy with the rich and powerful at the top . After independence, corruption was used not only as a means of advancement but also as a means to provide goods and services . In this way, corruption became a method for lowly-paid bureaucrats to raise revenue in order to boost infrastructural and social projects as well as supplement incomes.

Causes of corruption in Mexico

Social advancement and economic survival
Some corruption exists as a means to either boost ones standing in the local community or to supplement the extremely low incomes that most of the Mexican population receive. Many Mexican officials use corruption to either boost their social influence or to boost their income. Corruption can also be caused by a desire to manipulate and influence other people.

Corruption in the police
Corruption in the Mexican police can take many forms; it ranges from taking bribes to ignore crimes to active participation in criminal activity such as extortion, drug-trafficking, and assassination. The Mexican police are notorious for their corruption that is evident on all levels of law-enforcement, local and federal. Some Mexican police officers enter law-enforcement not because of a genuine interest in policing but because of ulterior motives. Some join to escape criminal pasts in other states, others join to earn some money before moving onto other business ventures, while others join to increase their criminal networks, allowing them to boost drug, spread crime, and increase connections for distribution.

Effects of police corruption
There are several resulting effects of widespread police corruption. Over 92% of crimes go unreported or are not investigated according to Mexico’s 2012 National Survey on Victimization and Perception of Public Security.  More than two thirds of Mexican citizens believe that some or all Mexican Police officers are corrupt.  43% of Mexican citizens believe that corruption is the main obstacle facing successful law-enforcement.  Many people have reported bribing the police, even for minor incidents such as illegal parking and other traffic violations.  Mexico's business officials have noted that police corruption has had a severely negative influence on business and economic progress. Police corruption is also, in part, to blame for the continued spread of illicit narcotics and the growth of the drug manufacturing and distribution industries.

Efforts to stop corruption
The Mexican government claims to have taken many steps to combat corruption. Despite these efforts, even when individual cases of corruption are reported, the matter is seldom investigated and almost never prosecuted.

References

http://chronicle.uchicago.edu/951127/lomnitz.shtml
http://business-anti-corruption.com/country-profiles/the-americas/mexico/snapshot.aspx

http://www.kentlaw.edu/perritt/courses/seminar/joanna-benjamin-Seminar%20Paper-final.htm
http://www.transparency.org/country#MEX
https://www.ganintegrity.com/portal/country-profiles/mexico/

Corruption in Mexico
Law enforcement in Mexico
Mexico